Runco International is a subsidiary of Planar Systems, Inc., an American multinational corporation headquartered in Beaverton, Oregon, that manufactures a wide range of display devices.

History
Runco International was founded by Sam Runco with wife, Lori, in Northern California in 1987. He is a founding member of the Custom Electronic Design and Installation Association (CEDIA) and has also received the Lifetime Achievement Award] from CEDIA.  Sam Runco has also been inducted into  Dealerscope magazine's Hall Of Fame and for  his contributions to the home theater industry.

The first Runco large screen projection system  was introduced in 1970. Prior to the incorporation of Runco International, the company functioned as Runco Video. Cinemabeam was Runco Video's first projector to feature external convergence controls that allowed the video image to be projected onto large screens. Two years later, Runco magnified the image of a 15" television using a fresnel lens to project it onto a wall, a turning point for large screen entertainment.

Runco International was incorporated in 1987 and launched the Runco International HT (Home Theater) video projector.  As the home theater market expanded, the company acquired additional consumer electronics brands, including the Vidikron video display brand. By the early 1990s, Runco International had expanded its corporate offices in California, and developed worldwide distribution. It had become a popular brand of CRT projectors, selling models produced by other manufacturers such as Zenith Electronics, NEC, and Barco.

Runco last recorded net sales as a private company of $54.6 million in the 12 months ending March 31, 2007. In May 2007, Runco was acquired by Planar Systems, Inc. Runco operations including product design, manufacturing, customer service, marketing and training teams were transitioned to Planar's headquarters located in Beaverton.

Product lines
Front projectors: Signature Series, VideoXtreme Series, Reflection Series
Plasma display monitors: PlasmaWall Portfolio, CinemaWall Portfolio
Liquid-crystal display monitors: Crystal Portfolio, Climate Portfolio
In-wall projection systems: VideoWall, CineWall
Video processors: DHD Digital Controller, SDC Digital Controller
Signal enhancers: LiveLink DVI Cabling System

Registered products and technologies

CinemaPro
CinemaWall
CineWide
Crystal Series
Dynamic Pixel Protection
Imagix
IntelliWide
LiveLink
PlasmaView
ProjectAVision
Radiant
Reflection
Runco
Theater Manager
VHD
Vidikron
Virtual High Definition
VirtualWide
Vivix
Vivx
WideVision
Video Xtreme
Pixel for Pixe

References

External links

Product reviews
 The New York Times DealBook, featuring the Runco D-113d projector - 
 Jonathan Blum, Fortune Small Business - A $9000 Bargain TV
 Jonathan Blum, Fortune Small Business – A $20,000 TV Actually Worth the Price
 Eric Taub, New York Times Gadgetwise
 Home Theater Review – Runco PlasmaWall XP-65HD

Electronics companies of the United States